Illegal dumping, also called fly dumping or fly tipping (UK), is the dumping of waste illegally instead of using an authorized method such as curbside collection or using an authorized rubbish dump. It is the illegal deposit of any waste onto land, including waste dumped or tipped on a site with no license to accept waste. The United States Environmental Protection Agency developed a “profile” of the typical illegal dumper. Characteristics of offenders include local residents, construction and landscaping contractors, waste removers, scrap yard operators, and automobile and tire repair shops.

Terminology
Illegal dumping is typically distinguished from littering by the type and amount of material and/or the manner in which it is discarded. An example of littering could be throwing a cigarette on the ground. However, emptying a rubbish bin with no permission in a public or private area can be classified as illegal dumping.

The term fly tipping is derived from the verb tip, meaning "to throw out of a vehicle", and on the fly, meaning "on the wing" – to throw away carelessly or casually.

Types of materials dumped 

Illegal dumping involves the unauthorized disposal of numerous types of waste. Typical materials dumped include building materials from construction sites, such as drywall, roofing shingles, lumber, brick, concrete, and siding. Other frequently dumped materials include automobile parts, household appliances, household waste, furniture, yard scraps, and medical waste.

Causes of illegal dumping 
The reasons people illegally dump vary; however, research indicates that lack of legal waste disposal options is a primary factor. A shortage of legal disposal options drives demand for waste removal service, increasing prices. Studies also have found unit pricing, which involves charging a set price per bag of garbage thrown out, contribute to illegal dumping. Although the intent of unit pricing is to encourage people to use other forms of waste disposal such as recycling and composting, people often turn to disposing of waste in unauthorized areas to save money. Additionally, weak enforcement of laws prohibiting illegal dumping and a lack of public awareness regarding the environmental, health, and economic dangers of illegal dumping contribute.

Effects of illegal dumping 
Effects of illegal dumping include health, environmental, and economic consequences. While legal waste disposal locations, such as landfills, are designed to contain waste and its byproducts from infiltrating the surrounding environment, illegal dumping areas do not typically incorporate the same safeguards. Due to this, illegal dumping may sometimes lead to pollution of the surrounding environment. Toxins or hazardous materials infiltrating soil and drinking water threaten the health of local residents. Additionally, illegal dump sites that catch fire pollute the air with toxic particles. Environmental pollution due to illegal dumping causes short-term and long-term health issues. Short-term issues include asthma; congenital illnesses; stress and anxiety; headaches, dizziness and nausea; and eye and respiratory infections. Long-term concerns include cancer and kidney; liver; respiratory; cardiovascular; brain; nervous; and lymphohematopoietic diseases. Beyond negative health outcomes due to pollution and toxic waste, illegal dumps pose a physical threat. Unstable piles of material and exposed nails threaten harm to humans, specifically children who may be attracted to illegal dumps as play areas.

Illegal dumps also attract vermin and insects. Tires, a material frequently illegally disposed of as most municipalities ban their disposal in landfills, provide an ideal breeding ground for mosquitos due to stagnant water collected within. Mosquitoes transfer life-threatening diseases, such as encephalitis and West Nile virus, to humans.

Materials disposed of in illegal dumps, specifically tires and electronic waste, are combustible. Outbreaks of fire at illegal dump sites can lead to forest fires, causing erosion and destroying habitat.

Illegal dumping also negatively affects surrounding property values. Unattractive and odorous accumulations of waste discourage commercial and residential developers from improving communities. Additionally, existing residents may have difficulty “taking pride” in their neighborhoods.

In addition to decreasing property values and, therefore, tax revenue for governments, illegal dumping costs governments millions of dollars in clean up costs. In the United Kingdom, the Environmental Protection Agency spends £100–150 million annually to investigate and clean up illegal dump sites. The United States Environmental Protection Agency estimates several million in costs each year nationwide.

How to combat illegal dumping 

Efforts to combat illegal dumping vary in each situation as solutions are crafted with specific community dynamics in mind. However, common approaches include a combination of limiting access to illegal dumping sites, surveillance, enforcement, and increasing access to legal waste disposal opportunities. Listed below are common techniques employed by governing bodies:

Limit access 

The majority of illegal dumpers engage in illicit waste disposal at night, as darkness helps them avoid detection. Installing lighting around known or potential illegal dumping sites deters the practice. In Canada Bay, New South Wales, the city installed solar powered lights in dumping “hot spots”. Following installation of the lights, the city received fewer complaints regarding illegal dumping in those areas.

Other methods of limiting access include re-landscaping and beautifying illegal dump sites. Adding aesthetic amenities such as grass, flowers, and benches demonstrates that the site is well maintained, discouraging dumpers. Additionally, increasing community use of the area will adjust locals’ perception of the site from dumping ground to valued open space.

Adding barriers such as fencing, rocks, locked gates, and concrete blocks prevents offenders from accessing dump sites with their vehicles, completely deterring illegal dumping or reducing the volume of disposed materials. For example, Maitland, New South Wales erected fences around rural dumping sites prevented vehicles from gaining access. Continued monitoring 12 months later showed that 80% of dump sites protected by the fences experienced negligible illegal waste disposal activity.

Increase surveillance and enforcement 

Increasing offenders’ risk of getting caught is also a way to combat illegal dumping. The most common way to accomplish this is through surveillance measures, such as video cameras. Camera footage can help law enforcement officials identify dumpers while also collecting data on peak dumping periods. Installation of fake cameras has also been shown to be a deterrent. Police patrols, helicopter and plane surveillance, and community surveillance are also options for increasing risk. Police presence generally deters illegal activity, while community surveillance depends upon residents reporting known illegal dumpers to law enforcement for a monetary reward. The cities of Los Angeles, Sacramento, and Oakland all implement similar reporting schemes.

Cities can implement periodic compliance campaigns, which involve randomly conducted “crackdowns” by law enforcement. Increased police patrols, anti-dumping signage posted in known illegal disposal sites, random inspections of property, and publicity regarding convicted illegal dumpers and the use surveillance can deter illegal dumping.

Provide alternatives 

Removing illegal dumpers’ reasons for improperly disposing of waste is also an option for governing bodies. Offenders often dump to save money. Cities can offer free or subsidized waste services to residents to encourage legal disposal. If free and subsidized programs are not feasible due to funding limitations, cities must ensure affordability of waste disposal services. Offering alternate disposal options like recycling and compost centers is also recommended. Giving fines or assigning liability for clean-up costs to those caught illegally disposing of waste can also act as a deterrent.

Combating illegal dumping also involves promoting legal waste disposal avenues. Offering kerbside collection and improving waste storage in high density residential areas provides residents with convenient trash disposal options. Communication of available services is important to the success of such programs. Offering similar accommodations for commercial and industrial waste generated by office buildings, restaurants, schools, and factories will also decrease instances of illegal dumping.

Cities can also combat illegal dumping by offering disposal options for materials and substances banned from landfills, such as tires, toxic and hazardous waste, and medical waste. The Massachusetts Department of Environmental Protection recommends chipping or shredding tires so that they can be recycled in other uses such as highways, playgrounds, and running tracks. The United States Environmental Protection Agency recommends disposing of household hazardous and toxic waste in the nearest community drop off location. For example, Boston, Massachusetts holds drop off days four times per year.

Similar rules apply to disposal of medical waste. In Boston, officials recommend storing syringes in a sharps container and disposing in a designated community site. The city also recommends utilizing mail back services to dispose of used syringes.

Education 

City governments can implement education campaigns to further mitigate illegal dumping. For example, cities can inform residents and businesses of legal waste disposal avenues through mailed flyers, newspaper and radio announcements, and posters. Posting signs near known illegal dumping sites can also help deter offenders.

Cleaning up existing dumps 
According to the United States Environmental Protection Agency, waste attracts more waste. Therefore, cleaning up existing illegal dumps is a helpful deterrent for additional illegal dumping. The United States Environmental Protection Agency instituted a program to cap open dumps in tribal communities. 1,100 of these dumps exist in the United States and pose health and environmental risks to the surrounding communities. The open dumps are closed off with a clay liner and soil depth accounting for infiltration and erosion. "Native dryland grass" is planted on top of the newly covered dump to prevent erosion and water monitoring wells are installed nearby.

Illegal dumping in Campania, Italy 
The triangle of death in Campania, Italy is Europe's largest illegal waste dump. The area, which encompasses Italian municipalities Acerra, Marigliano, and Nola, experiences illegal waste disposal practices by the Camorra such as unauthorized burying of toxic waste under places frequented by humans. Frequent fires at dumping sites and illegal waste fires set by residents have resulted in contamination of the air and drinking water. Additionally, the land has deteriorated due to the illegal waste.

The environmental pollution caused by the illegal dumping has resulted in elevated instances of cancer and cancer mortality in the region. In 2014 and 2015, the Italian government funded health screenings to track the rise in illnesses in Campania. Studies conducted using the data collected from these screenings found elevated instances of leukemia, lymphoma, and colorectal and liver cancer mortality in one of Campania's districts. The study attributed this increase in cancer and cancer mortality with toxic exposures from the illegal waste.

Electronic waste in China 

Illegal dumping of electronic waste, or e-waste, presents environmental and health concerns in China. The informal e-waste sector recycles the majority of e-waste in China, which is supplied through consumption, importation, and production. Foreign governments often send e-waste to China as the informal sector offers cheaper recycling services. China is not only the “largest e-waste dumping site”, it also generates large amounts of e-waste. In 2006, China produced 1.3 kg of e-waste per capita.

The informal e-waste sector lacks formal government oversight and pays its workers low wages while using recycling practices that expose both workers and the environment to toxic materials. Toxic substances are found in leachates, particulate matter, ashes, fumes, wastewater, and effluents generated during dumping, dismantling, and burning throughout the recycling process. Particles emitted are carried through the air and deposited nearby recycling centers and in surrounding areas. Leachates and wastewater infiltrate the soil, drinking water, livestock, and fish, exposing humans to toxic substances.

In recent years, China has begun to address the informal e-waste sector. At the governmental level, improvements have been made to waste management practices through adoption of Western management schemes such as those found in Japan, the United States, and the European Union. Additionally, the Chinese government has invested in improved e-waste collection and processing. Locally, various Chinese cities have constructed “recycling industrial parks” where e-waste can be processed efficiently and without harm to the environment. Regulations on e-waste have been implemented in the Chinese regions of Beijing, Shanghai, Jiangsu province, Zhejiang province and Guangdong province.

Corporations such as Nokia and Lenovo instituted free return services for Chinese customers who wish to dispose of old electronic products from the two companies.

United Kingdom
Rubbish disposal in the UK is heavily regulated, with most households having on average one 240 litre bin for recyclable waste and one similar bin of non recyclable waste every week; some areas have additional similar or smaller bins for garden, food, or specific recycling waste. Any large rubbish, e.g., old furniture and mattresses, may need to be taken to the local waste depot by the home owner at their own expense, although many councils will collect certain items for free or for a small fee. This leads to some people simply leaving their waste in open public spaces or untended public gardens. This is called fly tipping. In addition, commercial or industrial users may fly-tip to avoid waste handling charges, as will unofficial and unlicensed waste disposal firms.

Taxes on landfill in the UK have led to illegal waste dumping. Materials illegally disposed of can range from green waste and domestic items to abandoned cars and construction waste, much of which may be hazardous or toxic.

As the cost of disposing of household rubbish and waste increases, so does the number of individuals and businesses that fly-tip, and the UK government has made it easier for members of the public to report fly-tipping. The fine or punishment is normally defined by the local council that operates in the local area in which the rubbish was dumped. According to the BBC, fly-tipping costs councils in England and Wales more than £50m annually (2016).

Open dumping

Open dumps are locations where illegally dumped, abandoned piles of waste and debris are left in noticeable quantities. Fines are a common punishment for a person caught dumping at an open dump. Open dumps are commonly found in forests, backyards and abandoned buildings. Open dumps are sometimes removed shortly after they are created, but most will persist for an indefinite period of time when the site is situated in the wilderness or in public space without adequate public services.

See also
Litter
Road debris
Toxic waste dumping by the 'Ndrangheta
Triangle of death (Italy)
Urban runoff

References

Waste management
Waste law
Environmental crime